Isidor Kaufmann (22 March 1853 in Arad – 1921 in Vienna) was an Austro-Hungarian painter of Jewish themes. Having devoted his career to genre painting, he traveled throughout Eastern Europe in search of scenes of Jewish, often Hasidic life. The artist's life and work was featured by the Jewish Museum Vienna 1995 in a show curated by Tobias G. Natter.

Life and career
Born to Hungarian Jewish parents in Arad, Kingdom of Hungary (presently in Romania), Kaufmann was originally destined for a commercial career, and could fulfill his wish to become a painter only later in life.

In 1875, he went to the Landes-Zeichenschule in Budapest, where he remained for one year. In 1876, he left for Vienna, but being refused admission to the Academy of Fine Arts there, he became a pupil of the portrait painter Joseph Matthäus Aigner. He then entered the Malerschule of the Vienna Academy, and later became a private pupil of Professor Trenkwald.

His most noted paintings refer to the life of Jews in Poland. They include: Der Besuch des Rabbi (the original of which was owned by Emperor Franz Joseph I, in the Kunsthistorisches Museum), Schachspieler, Der Zweifler (for which he received the gold medal at the Weltausstellung of 1873).

Kaufmann's other honors include: the Baron Königswarter Künstler-Preis, the gold medal of the Emperor of Germany, a gold medal of the International Exhibition at Munich, and a medal of the third class at the Exposition Universelle in Paris.

One of his most prominent students was Lazar Krestin.

He married a cantor's daughter in 1882. They had five children.

References 

 
 Tobias G. Natter (Ed.): Rabbiner – Bücher – Talmudschüler. Bilder des Wiener Malers Isidor Kaufmann 1853–1921, exhibition catalog, Jewish Museum Vienna, 1995 .
 
 Alexander Kohut, Berühmte Israelitische Männer und Frauen
  Ileana-Rodica Dinculescu, "Teme în pictura unor artişti evrei din Europa Modernă (până la mişcarea de avangardă)" ("Themes in the Art of Jewish Painters in Modern Europe– Before the Avant-Garde Movement"), at the University of Bucharest site
 Isidor Kaufmann (1853-1921)

1853 births
1921 deaths
People from Arad, Romania
Romanian Jews
Austro-Hungarian Jews
19th-century Hungarian painters
20th-century Hungarian painters
19th-century Hungarian people
20th-century Hungarian people
Jewish painters
Hungarian male painters
19th-century Hungarian male artists
20th-century Hungarian male artists